This is a list of elections in Canada that will be held in 2023. Included are municipal, provincial and federal elections, by-elections on any level, referendums and party leadership races at any level.

List
January 9: Yukon Liberal Party leadership election (acclamation)
January 13: Municipal by-election in Ryley, Alberta
January 23: Conseil scolaire Viamonde and Conseil scolaire catholique MonAvenir by-elections
January 25: Tsawwassen First Nation by-election
February 4: 2023 Ontario New Democratic Party leadership election (acclamation) 
February 10: Municipal by-election in Devon, Alberta
February 13: Municipal by-election in Valley Waters, New Brunswick 
February 14: Municipal by-election in Delia, Alberta
February 23: Municipal by-election in Halkirk, Alberta
February 25: Municipal by-elections in  Peace River Regional District and Salmo, British Columbia
March 4: Municipal by-election in Invermere, British Columbia
March 11: Municipal by-election in Alberni-Clayoquot Regional District
March 13: Saint-Henri–Sainte-Anne, Quebec provincial by-election
March 16: Hamilton Centre, Ontario provincial by-election
March 26: 2023 Green Party of Manitoba leadership election
April 3: 2023 Prince Edward Island general election
May 29: 2023 Alberta general election
June 26: 2023 Toronto mayoral by-election
October 3: 2023 Manitoba general election
October 3: 2023 Northwest Territories general election
October 15: 2023 Progressive Conservative Party of Newfoundland and Labrador leadership election
October 16: Iqaluit municipal election
December 4: Nunavut municipal elections (hamlets)

References

External links
BC Local by-elections
Quebec municipal by-elections
Government of Canada election calendar

2023 elections in Canada
Political timelines of the 2020s by year